Live at the Jazz Workshop is a live album by jazz pianist Thelonious Monk, that was recorded at the Jazz Workshop in San Francisco. The album was recorded on November 3 and 4, 1964, and released by Columbia Records in 1982.

Release history
The tapes of these two shows stayed locked away in the Columbia Records vault for almost 20 years, until the label released a double-LP from them shortly after Monk's death in 1982. A CD release followed in 2001, under the name of Live at the Jazz Workshop - Complete, featuring a number of bonus tracks, and nearly doubling the length of the record.

Track listing
1982 release

Side 1
 "Don't Blame Me/Ba-lue Bolivar Ba-lues-are"
 "Well, You Needn't"
 "Evidence (Justice)/Rhythm-A-Ning"
 "'Round About Midnight"
 "I'm Getting Sentimental Over You"

Side 2
 "Bemsha Swing"
 "Memories of You/Just You, Just Me"
 "Blue Monk"
 "Misterioso"
 "Hackensack"
 "Bright Mississippi"
 "Epistrophy"

Live at the Jazz Workshop: Complete (2001)

CD 1 [November 3, 1964]
 "Don't Blame Me" – 1:43
 "Ba-lue Bolivar Ba-lues-are" – 7:32
 "Well, You Needn't" – 10:30
 "Evidence/Rhythm-A-Ning" – 6:24
 "Epistrophy" (theme) – 1:05
 "Hackensack" – 8:03
 "Bright Mississippi" – 2:50
 "Evidence" – 4:36
 "Epistrophy" – 3:53
 "Round Midnight" 6:06
 "I'm Getting Sentimental Over You" – 6:41
 "Memories of You" – 2:28
 "Just You, Just Me" – 6:44
 "Epistrophy" – 5:28

CD 2 [November 4, 1964]
 "Blue Monk" – 7:06
 "Well, You Needn't" – 8:08
 "Bright Mississippi" – 8:11
 "Bemsha Swing" – 4:09
 "Round Midnight" – 6:27
 "Nutty" – 8:08
 "Straight, No Chaser" – 6:29
 "Thelonious" – 3:57
 "Hackensack" – 5:35
 "Misterioso" – 6:52
 "Ba-lue Bolivar Ba-lues-are" – 7:47
 "Epistrophy" (theme) – 1:02

Personnel
 Thelonious Monk – piano
 Charlie Rouse – tenor saxophone
 Larry Gales – bass
 Ben Riley – drums

References

Thelonious Monk live albums
1964 live albums
Albums produced by Teo Macero
Columbia Records live albums
Albums recorded at the Jazz Workshop